Alpine skiing at the 2011 Winter Universiade was held at the Palandöken Mountain in Erzurum, Turkey from January 29 to February 6, 2011. There had been no downhill competition.

Men's events

Women's events

Medal table

References

2011 in alpine skiing
Alpine skiing
Skiing competitions in Turkey
2011